The Symphony No. 3 (also known as Symphony No. 3 "Silence") is the third symphony by the Scottish composer James MacMillan.  The piece was first performed on April 17, 2003 in NHK Hall, Tokyo, by the NHK Symphony Orchestra under the conductor Charles Dutoit.

Composition
The symphony has a duration of roughly 36 minutes and is composed in one continuous movement.  The title of the piece comes from the 1966 novel Silence by the Japanese author Shūsaku Endō.  MacMillan described this inspiration in the score program notes, writing:
The composition also includes a musical allusion to the prelude from Richard Wagner's opera Das Rheingold.

Instrumentation
The work is scored for an orchestra comprising two flutes, alto flute (doubling piccolo), two oboes, cor anglais, two clarinets, bass clarinet, contrabass clarinet, two bassoons, contrabassoon, four horns, three trumpets, three trombones, tuba, timpani, four percussionists (playing marimba, tuned gongs, 5 temple blocks, snare drum, suspended cymbal, glockenspiel, steel drums, bass drum, crotales, tubular bells, 3 heavy metal bars, 2 congas, 2 timbales, medium tam-tam, cencerros, vibraphone, large tam-tam and thunder sheet), harp, piano, and strings.

Reception
Roger Thomas of BBC Music Magazine lauded the symphony, writing, "The work is a hauntingly ambivalent study at both the musical and philosophical levels, with themes and textures arising seemingly from their own absence, interacting and developing, then being allowed to return to their origins."  David Nice of The Arts Desk was more critical, however, remarking that the work "sounded like an unwieldy impersonation of the monumental."

WQXR-FM included the piece in their list of the "Top Five Sounds of Silence" in classical music, remarking that MacMillan "finds all kinds of potential and promise in silence, dots this work (as well as many of his others) with pregnant pauses, and meditative moments."

See also
List of compositions by James MacMillan

References

Symphonies by James MacMillan
2002 compositions
MacMillan 3